Cha Gordo (literally Fat Tea) is a culinary tradition amongst the Macanese community in Macau that is likened to high tea.

History
Historically, families with Portuguese heritage in Macau would host a Cha Gordo for a number of occasions, including Catholic holidays, christening, or birthdays, but it can be held for any reason. Some families, historically, would even host one on a weekly basis.

A Cha Gordo would take place following a Macanese wedding, instead of the elaborate banquet seen in Chinese weddings.

Composition
Cha Gordos are noted to be elaborate, consisting of 12 dishes or more. Cha Gordos typically start in the mid-afternoon, in order to allow the children to eat, and allow the adults to continue on with the entertainment, as the children go to bed.

Some of the dishes included in a Cha Gordo include Bolinhos de bacalhau, Minchi, Sopa de lacassá, and Tacho.

Present day
Due to cramped living conditions in modern-day Macau, Cha Gordo has become a much rarer affair, but they have been held as community events on a regular basis (such as on Christmas), in an effort to preserve Macanese culture.

References

Macanese cuisine
Macanese people
Tea